Manuel Prietl (born 3 August 1991) is an Austrian professional footballer who plays as a midfielder for 2. Bundesliga club Arminia Bielefeld.

Club career
Prietl joined Arminia Bielefeld in summer 2016. In December 2017, he agreed a contract extension until 2021 with the club.

International career
Prietl is a youth international having played for the Austria U21 national team.

References

Living people
1991 births
Association football midfielders
Austrian footballers
Austria under-21 international footballers
Austria youth international footballers
Austrian Football Bundesliga players
SV Mattersburg players
TSV Hartberg players
Arminia Bielefeld players
Bundesliga players
2. Bundesliga players
Austrian expatriate footballers
Austrian expatriate sportspeople in Germany
Expatriate footballers in Germany